J. Anne Parks (born July 1, 1955) is an American politician. She is a former member of the South Carolina House of Representatives from the 12th District, serving since 1997. She is a member of the Democratic party. In the 2022 general election, she was defeated by Republican Daniel Gibson.

References

Living people
1955 births
Democratic Party members of the South Carolina House of Representatives
African-American state legislators in South Carolina
21st-century American politicians
People from Greenwood, South Carolina
21st-century African-American politicians
20th-century African-American people

Women state legislators in South Carolina